Henry Hsu (born 17 September 1987) is a Taiwanese singer of Hokkien pop.

Hsu albums include Most Loved (2011), Writing Your Song (2012), and Yicunzhenxin [An Inch of True Heart] (2014).

Hsu's subsequent Hokkien albums have been shortlisted for Golden Melody Awards. Mend the Dreams was nominated for the Golden Melody Award for Album of the Year and Best Taiwanese Album during the 2018 award ceremony, and Hsu himself received a nomination for Best Male Taiwanese Singer. Another of Hsu's Hokkien works, I Am Not As Happy As You Tonight, garnered him a second nomination for Best Male Taiwanese Singer in the 2019 Golden Melody Award ceremony. At the 32nd Golden Melody Awards in 2021, Hsu's album Ten secured a nomination for Best Hokkien Album, and his third as Best Male Taiwanese Singer. Hsu won the latter award.

References

1987 births
Living people
Taiwanese male singers
Musicians from Kaohsiung
Taiwanese Hokkien pop singers
21st-century Taiwanese singers